Michael John Murphy is an American diplomat who has served as the United States ambassador to Bosnia and Herzegovina since February 2022.

Early life and education
Michael John Murphy was born in Rochester, New York to John Murphy and Barbara (Schafer) Murphy. He is the eldest of three sons. The family lived in Chili, New York until 1973 when they moved to East Greenbush, New York.  Murphy attended Columbia High School, graduating in 1983. Murphy earned a Bachelor of Arts from Hamilton College in 1987 where he was also involved with Phi Beta Kappa. Murphy and his wife, Kimberly Haroz, met in their diplomatic training class in 1991, and the two married in Lagos, Nigeria in 1992. They have no children.

Career
Murphy is a career member of the Senior Foreign Service with the rank of Minister-Counselor where he has served for 30 years. From 2017 to 2018, served as director of the office for European security & political-military affairs in the Bureau of European and Eurasian Affairs. From 2015 to 2017, he served as the associate dean of the leadership and management school at the National Foreign Affairs Training Center. From 2012 to 2015, Murphy was the deputy chief of mission at the U.S. Embassy in Gaborone, Botswana and also as Chargé d’Affaires, a.i., in Botswana from February 2014 to January 2015.  From 2009 to 2012, he was deputy chief of mission at the U.S. Embassy in Pristina, Kosovo and served for three years as political counselor at the U.S. Embassy in Sarajevo, Bosnia and Herzegovina. Other overseas postings include London; Yaoundé, Cameroon; and Lagos, Nigeria.  In Washington, D.C., he served as chief of staff to both the Assistant Secretary of State for European and Eurasian Affairs and the Director General of the Foreign Service. He also served as desk officer for Bulgaria and for the North Atlantic Treaty Organization. From June 18, 2018, until September 24, 2021, he had served as the Deputy Assistant Secretary of State in the Bureau of European and Eurasian Affairs.

United States ambassador to Bosnia and Herzegovina
On July 16, 2021, President Joe Biden nominated Murphy to be the next United States ambassador to Bosnia and Herzegovina. On October 5, 2021, a hearing on his nomination was held before the Senate Foreign Relations Committee. On October 19, 2021, his nomination was reported favorably out of committee. The United States Senate confirmed him on December 18, 2021 by voice vote. He presented his credentials on February 23, 2022. In April 2022, he supported UDIK's idea about monument at Kazani.

Personal life
Murphy speaks Serbo-Croatian and French.

See also
Ambassadors of the United States

References

External links

Year of birth missing (living people)
Place of birth missing (living people)
Living people
21st-century American diplomats
Ambassadors of the United States to Bosnia and Herzegovina
American consuls
Hamilton College (New York) alumni
United States Assistant Secretaries of State
United States Department of State officials
United States Foreign Service personnel